32 Squadron or 32nd Squadron may refer to:

 No. 32 Squadron RAAF, a unit of the Royal Australian Air Force
 No. 32 Squadron (Finland), a unit of the Finnish Air Force
 No. 32 (The Royal) Squadron RAF, a unit of the United Kingdom Royal Air Force
 VFA-32 (Strike Fighter Squadron 32), a unit of the United States Navy

See also
 32nd Division (disambiguation)
 32nd Brigade (disambiguation)
 32nd Regiment (disambiguation)
 32nd Battalion (disambiguation)